"High and Dry" is a 1995 song by the English band Radiohead.

High and Dry may also refer to:
 High 'n' Dry, a 1981 album by Def Leppard
 High 'n' Dry (Saturday Night), a 1981 song by Def Leppard
 High & Dry (album), a 1991 album by Marty Brown
 High and Dry (book), a 2007 book written by Guy Pearse
 High and Dry (film), a 1954 British comedy film
 High & Dry (1987 TV series), a 1987 British television sitcom
 High & Dry (2018 TV series), a 2018 British television series
 "High and Dry", a bluegrass-flavored song by The Rolling Stones on their 1966 album Aftermath (The Rolling Stones album)  
 "High and Dry", a song by Poco from their 1974 album Cantamos
 High and dry, a reference to High Church clergy